Urmila Mahanta is an Indian actress. A student of the Film and Television Institute of India, Pune, Mahanta appeared in various plays, short films and television series, before making her feature film debut in the critically acclaimed 2012 Tamil crime thriller Vazhakku Enn 18/9. She has acted in Hindi, Assamese, Bengali and Malayalam films.

Early and personal life 
Mahanta was born to Giridhar Mahanta and Ramala Mahanta in Sonapur, Assam; she has three siblings- Jutika Mahanta, Munmi Mahanta and Munindra Mahanta. Mahanta did her entire schooling in Sonapur and later graduated from Dimoria College in Khetri, Kamrup. Mahanta spent her major part of life in Mumbai, Maharashtra, and then went on to enroll at the Film and Television Institute of India, Pune.

Career

Mahanta had been acting in plays since her childhood and won many awards. Afterwards, she was featured in several television serials such as Murder and Tejimola for Doordarshan (NE), which were followed by appearances in various critically acclaimed short films including Aaliya, that won the Special Critic Award at the 2012 Mumbai International Film Festival, Their Story and Cheng Kurthy. Mahanta was also seen in Assamese singer Tarali Sarma's album Henguliya.

While attending the International Film Festival of India at Goa, she was spotted and selected among few others following a lengthy process lasting two years including multiple auditions conducted by director Balaji Sakthivel for his drama-thriller Vazhakku Enn 18/9. Mahanta has received notable praise for portraying the character of a slum dweller, Jyothi, who works as a housemaid. The Times of India critic M. Suganth wrote: "It is Urmila Mahanta's understated performance as Jothi that is the film's pivot". Similarly, a reviewer from IndiaGlitz.com noted that Mahanta was "impressive as a short poetry on screen", further adding that she "bubbles with energy and emotes at ease", while another critic quoted: "Urmila is a treat to watch. She delivers what Balaji Sakthivel wants from her. She is cool and passes the test with ease and elan". The film itself received widespread acclaim, with reviewers calling it "excellent", a "must-watch", and even "the film of the year". Mahanta ultimately went on to state that Vazhakku Enn 18/9 was the best decision she had ever made.

She then shot for her first Bollywood project, Pareshaanpur directed Dilip K. Mukharia. She played a supporting role in Ajita Suchitra Veera's Ballad of Rustom (Rustom Ki Dastaan) that fetched Veera the Best Director Award at the 12th Osian's Cinefan Festival of Asian and Arab Cinema, and was shortlisted in the Best Picture category at the 86th Academy Awards. In 2014, she made her debut in the Bengali language with the remake of Vazhakku Enn 18/9, Chirodini Tumi Je Amar 2, and in her mother tongue Assamese with TRP Aru. Due to the delay in Pareshaanpurs release, her maiden Hindi release became Manjhi - The Mountain Man.

In 2015, she began work on her first Malayalam film Udal and AR Murugadoss' Hindi directorial Akira.

Filmography

Films

Awards and nominations

Other awards

 "Young Achievers" 2017 ' by Dalmia Bharat Cement Ltd.
 "Youth of the year " 2016 by NEEDS NGO
 "Youth Icone ,Dimoria" 2017
Best Actor (Female) : Assam State Film Awards (2015–16)

References

External links
 
 Articles on Urmila Mahanta (01, 02 and 03) on Prabhat Khabar

Year of birth missing (living people)
Living people
Actresses in Assamese cinema
Indian film actresses
Actresses in Tamil cinema
Actresses in Hindi cinema
People from Kamrup Metropolitan district
Actresses from Assam
Actresses in Bengali cinema
Actresses in Malayalam cinema
21st-century Indian actresses